William Magnay may refer to: 

Sir William Magnay, 1st Baronet, Lord Mayor of London
Sir William Magnay, 2nd Baronet, novelist